Wallace "Bud" Smith (April 2, 1924 – July 10, 1973) was a world lightweight boxing champion in 1955, who also competed in the 1948 Olympic Games. His trainer was John Joiner of Cincinnati, and his manager was Vic Marsillo.  Smith was murdered in 1973.

Amateur career
Born in Cincinnati, Ohio, Smith was the 1947 A.A.U. Featherweight Champion.  He won Chicago's 1948 lightweight Golden Gloves inter-city tournament with a furious attack against Luis Ortiz, achieving a knockout in 2:45 of the second round.  He represented the United States at the 1948 Olympic Games in the lightweight division. Smith defeated Chuck Davey of Michigan State University, to earn a spot on the team.

On August 24, 1949, he defeated Joe Discepoli in a ten-round unanimous decision in Cincinnati to take the USA Ohio State Lightweight Championship.  He reportedly ended his amateur career with a 52-4 record.

Professional career
Smith turned pro on November 29, 1948 with a first-round knockout of Torpedo Tinsley at the Music Hall in Cincinnati. Over the next seven years, Smith established himself as one of the world's top lightweights with victories over top-rated Red Top Davis, Orlando Zulueta, and Arthur Persley.

On November 20, 1954, Smith knocked out Arthur Persley in nine rounds in Miami on his way to his 1955 title shot.

Defeating Orlando Zulueta, May, December 1953
On May 5, 1953, Smith first defeated Cuban prodigy Orlando Zulueta in a ten-round unanimous decision at Cincinnati Gardens. On December 11, 1953, Smith defeated Zulueta again in a ten-round Unanimous Decision at Madison Square Garden.  The win helped Smith earn his much desired title bout against Jimmy Carter, as Zuleta was the number two contender for the lightweight crown at the time. In a somewhat close match before a small crowd of only 2,991, Smith's aggressiveness and solid punching won him the match, though Zulueta scored frequently with quick left jabs to the head and rights to the body.

Taking the World Lightweight Championship, June 1955
On June 29, 1955, Smith beat the 4-1 odds against him and defeated 3-time world lightweight champion Jimmy Carter in a fifteen-round split decision at Boston Garden to take the title. The fight was fierce and bloody and only 1,983 fans turned out for the contest between the black contestants who were not especially well known.  Carter needed fifteen stitches over his eyes to mend from the rough bout, in which he likely took the worst damage of his career.  Even Smith needed three stitches to recover from the bout.

Single defense of the title, October 1955
Four months later on October 19, 1955, he successfully defended the title against Carter in Cincinnati, winning in a fifteen-round unanimous decision. A national TV audience was unable to see the announcement of the final decision, because one of the judges, Joe Blink, had difficulty in adding up his scorecard, in what Sports Illustrated described as "the long, long count"

Losing the World Lightweight Championship, August 1956
On August 24, 1956, Smith lost his title in an upset to Joe Brown in a fifteen-round split decision in New Orleans. Smith was down twice in the fourteenth round.  The Associated Press had Smith ahead eight rounds to seven, though the officials gave him a greater lead, and Smith may have won the bout if not for suffering a broken right hand in the second round.  In a rematch with Brown on February 13, 1957, Smith lost to Brown in an eleventh-round TKO in Miami.  Smith went on to fight one more year, ending his career after losing 11 straight fights, half by knockout.

Life after boxing

Smith formally retired from boxing in 1959. The years passed by, and Smith dropped out of the public spotlight. His life was far from an easy one, with several brushes with the law, but the good-natured Smith was a popular figure in his neighborhood.

Murder

On July 10, 1973 Smith saw a man beating up a woman in Cincinnati and stepped in. After a struggle, the man pulled a gun and shot Smith in the head, killing him.

Professional boxing record

Achievements

See also
Lineal championship
List of lightweight boxing champions

References

External links
 
https://boxrec.com/media/index.php/National_Boxing_Association%27s_Quarterly_Ratings:_1956
 https://titlehistories.com/boxing/na/usa/ny/nysac-l.html

World lightweight boxing champions
1924 births
1973 deaths
Boxers from Cincinnati
Olympic boxers of the United States
Boxers at the 1948 Summer Olympics
Male murder victims
Deaths by firearm in Ohio
People murdered in Ohio
American male boxers
American murder victims